The Kloran is the handbook of the Ku Klux Klan. Versions of the Kloran typically contain detailed descriptions of the role of different Klan members as well as detailing Klan ceremonies and procedures. Its name is derived from that of the Islamic holy text, the Koran, but its content is completely dissimilar.

The letters Kl were often used at the beginning of words to delineate a Klan association. Examples include: Kloran, Klonversation (conversation), Klavern (cavern or tavern; local branch or meeting place), Klavaliers, etc. This differed from the practice of the Reconstruction Ku Klux Klan; very little of the Reconstruction Klan's terminology was carried over, and that mostly titles for high officials in the organization. The leader of an individual Klavern, for example, was an "Exalted Cyclops".

The original Kloran was written by William J. Simmons, for his revived "Knights of the Ku Klux Klan", . He drew heavily on his previous experiences as a "fraternalism"; he was a member of many different lodges and had sold memberships in the Woodmen of the World before deciding to revive the Klan. The Klan created the Kloran as a means to share their knowledge and to keep a set of values within the organization.

References

 Text of one version of the Kloran at Michigan State University

Ku Klux Klan
Handbooks and manuals
1916 books